Christ Church Cemetery is located in South Amboy, New Jersey. The cemetery is owned and operated by the Christ Episcopal Church in South Amboy. The cemetery opened in 1856 and is still accepting new burials.

Notable burials
 Allie Clark (1923–2012), Major League Baseball right-fielder
 Harold G. Hoffman (1896–1954), 41st Governor of New Jersey, from 1935 to 1938 who also represented New Jersey's 3rd congressional district in the United States House of Representatives, from 1927 to 1931.
 Benjamin F. Howell (1844–1933), represented New Jersey's 3rd congressional district in the United States House of Representatives, from 1895 to 1911

References

External links
Interment data for Christ Church Cemetery
 

Cemeteries in Middlesex County, New Jersey
Anglican cemeteries in the United States
South Amboy, New Jersey
1856 establishments in New Jersey